Amadou Cissé Dia (2 June 1915 – 1 November 2002) was a Senegalese politician and playwright. Born in Saint-Louis, Senegal, he wrote plays in French including Les Derniers Jours de Lat Dior, which concerns a griot's praise for Lat-Dior. In politics, Dia served as the second President of the National Assembly from 1968 to 1983, and as Minister of the Interior. He was reportedly nominated for the Nobel Peace Prize in the year Willy Brandt won.

He died in Dakar in 2002.

Plays
 La mort du Damel
 Les derniers jours de Lat Dior

References 

Presidents of the National Assembly (Senegal)
Defense ministers of Senegal
Health ministers of Senegal
Interior ministers of Senegal
Trade ministers of Senegal
Socialist Party of Senegal politicians
People from Saint-Louis, Senegal
1915 births
2002 deaths
Senegalese dramatists and playwrights
20th-century dramatists and playwrights